Museum Mayer van den Bergh is a museum in Antwerp, Belgium, housing the collection of the art dealer and collector Fritz Mayer van den Bergh (1858-1901). The major works are from the Gothic and Renaissance period in the Netherlands and Belgium, including paintings by Pieter Brueghel the Elder.

History
Fritz Mayer van den Bergh, born in 1858, collected art for most of his life, making his most expensive and important additions between 1897 and his death in 1901. He was especially interested in art from the 14th to sixteenth century, while his contemporaries considered the Gothic and Renaissance art dated. This fact enabled him to create a collection of 1.000 pieces of mostly Northern Renaissance art. After his death, his mother Henriette Mayer van den Bergh built a neo-gothic house in the banking district of Antwerp between 1901 and 1904, as a museum for the expansive art collection.

Collection
Breviarium Mayer van den Bergh, a late 15th-century or early 16th-century illustrated manuscript of 1412 pages, probably made for a rich Portuguese in Antwerp by Simon Bening, Gerard Horenbout and Jan Provost, Flemish miniaturists from the Ghent-Bruges school.
Pieter Brueghel the Elder: Dulle Griet (Mad Meg or Dull Gret), ca. 1562
Pieter Brueghel the Elder: Proverbs
Master Heinrich of Constance, Christ and Saint John Group, 14th century
Pieter Huys, The Temptation of Saint Anthony, 1577
Jan Mabuse, Magdalen
Quentin Matsys, Crucifixion
 a Pleurant, 15th Century.

Gallery

Notes

External links

Art museums and galleries in Belgium
Museums in Antwerp
Art museums established in 1904
1904 establishments in Belgium
Former private collections